Hispaniolana is a genus of air-breathing land snails, terrestrial pulmonate gastropod mollusks in the subfamily Polydontinae of the family Sagdidae.

Species 
Species in the genus Hispaniolana include:
 Hispaniolana angustata (Férussac, 1822)
 Hispaniolana audebardi (Reeve, 1854)
 Hispaniolana crispatus (Férussac, 1821)
 Hispaniolana dissita (Deshayes, 1850)
 Hispaniolana dominicensis (L. Pfeiffer, 1850)
 Hispaniolana gabbi (Pilsbry, 1933)
 Hispaniolana gigantea (Scopoli, 1786)
 Hispaniolana mcleani (Clench, 1962)
 Hispaniolana montana (Clench, 1962)
 Hispaniolana obliterata (Férussac, 1822)

References 

 Ferussac A.E.J.P.F. d'Audebard de , 1821 - Deuxième partie: Tableau particuliers des mollusques terrestres et fluviatiles, tableau de la famille des Limaçons et tableau de la famille des Auricules. In: Tableaux systématiques des animaux mollusques suivis d'un prodrome général pour tous les mollusques terrestres ou fluviatiles, vivants ou fossiles, p. 111 pp [quarto ed]
I, p. 402 pp
 Bank, R. A. (2017). Classification of the Recent terrestrial Gastropoda of the World. Last update: July 16, 2017.

External links

 Albers, J. C. (1850). Die Heliceen nach natürlicher Verwandtschaft systematisch geordnet. Berlin: Enslin. 262 pp

Sagdidae